Bob is an American sitcom television series created by Bill Steinkellner, Cheri Steinkellner, and Phoef Sutton. It aired on CBS from September 18, 1992, to December 27, 1993. The series was the third starring vehicle sitcom for Bob Newhart, following his previous successful CBS sitcoms The Bob Newhart Show and Newhart.

Synopsis
Newhart portrayed Bob McKay, the creator of the 1950s comic book superhero "Mad-Dog". Mad-Dog was a casualty of the Comics Code Authority, a real-life self-regulation authority formed to assuage concerns over violence and gore in comics in the 1950s. In the wake of the CCA, Bob became a greeting card artist. In the pilot, Mad-Dog is revived when the American-Canadian Trans-Continental Communications Company buys the rights to the series. Complications ensued when Ace Comics head Harlan Stone (John Cygan) insisted Mad-Dog should be a bloodthirsty vigilante rather than the hero Bob originally created. Bob initially turned down Harlan's offer to revive the series with the publisher, but after his wife, Kaye (Carlene Watkins), reminded Bob that Mad-Dog would never give up dreams in the face of defeat, he decided to compromise with Harlan on creative direction, and go back to do the revival. In the final episode of the first season, AmCanTranConComCo was sold to a millionaire who hated comic books, and the entire Mad-Dog staff, including Bob, was fired.

During the first season, Bob balances his work life with his personal life. Bob's wife Kaye is loyal and sensible, and a busy career woman herself. Their grown daughter, Trisha (Cynthia Stevenson), frequently bemoans her perpetually single state. At work, Bob has to deal with the more eccentric staff members: klutzy gofer Albie Lutz (Andrew Bilgore); spaced-out cartoon inker Chad Pfefferle (Timothy Fall); and curmudgeonly artist Iris Frankel (Ruth Kobart). Eventually, Bob also hired Trisha onto the Mad-Dog staff, where Chad developed a crush on her; she also moved into an apartment with her best friend, Kathy (Lisa Kudrow), where Albie also joined them temporarily.

Second season
When Bob returned in late October 1993, the show was changed completely. All of Bob's co-workers from the previous season disappeared and the show's premise had changed. Sylvia Schmitt (Betty White), the wife of his former boss (who had run off with his dental hygienist), hired Bob as President of Schmitt Greetings. Her obnoxious son Pete (Jere Burns), the vice-president of Sales who had expected to take over the company and now had to work for Bob, was irate. Others working at the company were the sarcastic bookkeeper Chris Szelinski (Megan Cavanagh) and dumb but lovable Whitey van der Bunt (Eric Allan Kramer), a member of the production team who adored Bob. Trisha and Kathy remained friends and housemates on a quest for true love.

Cast
Bob Newhart as Bob McKay, a greeting card artist who discovers a comic book he created is getting revived.
Carlene Watkins as Kaye McKay, Bob's loyal, sensible wife with a career of her own.
Cynthia Stevenson as Trisha McKay, Bob and Kaye's daughter, who frequently bemoans her single status.

Season one main cast
Ruth Kobart as Iris Frankel, a curmudgeonly artist who worked with Bob in his early days. She still calls him "Bobby McKay".
Timothy Fall as Chad Pfefferle, a spaced-out cartoon inker
Andrew Bilgore as Albie Lutz, a klutzy gofer with low self-esteem
John Cygan as Harlan Stone, the head of Ace Comics whom Bob frequently clashes with

Season two main cast
Betty White as Sylvia Schmitt, Bob's new boss
Jere Burns as Pete Schmitt, Sylvia's son and the vice president of sales, who was expected to have Bob's job.
Eric Allan Kramer as Whitey van der Bunt, a dim-witted member of the production team who is a fan of Bob's work.
Megan Cavanagh as Chris Szelinski, the sarcastic bookkeeper of the company

Recurring
Lisa Kudrow as Kathy Fleisher, Trisha's best friend
Tom Poston as Kathy's father, a fellow comic book writer alumnus who created "The Silencer". He only appears in season one.
Dorothy Lyman as Patty Fleisher, Kathy's mother. She only appears in season one.
Dick Martin as Buzz Loudermilk, a friend of Bob's and the creator of "Katie Carter, Army Nurse". In addition to this recurring role, Martin also directed several episodes of the series.
Christine Dunford as Shayla, Harlan's on-and-off girlfriend. She only appears in season one.

One character was heard but not seen – Mr. Terhorst (voice of Michael Cumpsty), the president of AmCanTranConComCo who communicated with all his employees anywhere that fiber-optics could be installed. Harlan even provided Bob will a cellular phone in which Mr. Terhorst would randomly tap into it and begin talking to Bob in his most private, intimate hours. Cryptic yet resourceful, Terhorst was a master mediator in all creative differences in the office, and was determined to make Mad-Dog a cultural phenomenon.

Notable guest stars
Carol Ann Susi as Debra ("P.C. or Not P.C."). Susi and Newhart would both go on to be recurring guest stars on The Big Bang Theory.
Bill Daily as Vic Victor, one of Bob's poker friends. Daily previously played Howard on The Bob Newhart Show, and said "Hi, Bob." whenever he showed up. ("A Streetcar Named Congress Douglas", "I'm Getting Remarried in the Morning")
Steve Lawrence as Don Palmero, one of Bob's poker friends. ("A Streetcar Named Congress Douglas", "I'm Getting Remarried in the Morning")
George Wendt and Bernadette Birkett as themselves ("Da Game")
Mara Wilson as Amelia ("Have Yourself a Married Little Christmas")

The season one episode "You Can't Win" played upon the series' comic book connection by guest starring comic book artists Bob Kane, Jack Kirby, Mell Lazarus, Jim Lee, Marc Silvestri, Mel Keefer, Paul Power, Art Thibert and Sergio Aragones (co-creator of Groo with "Bob" scripter Mark Evanier.)

Episodes

Season 1: 1992–93

Season 2: 1993

Production
In a rarity for TV sitcoms of the time, Bob was filmed with a video assist for the directors and producers to monitor the show during filming. All the artwork in season one was done by storyboard artist Paul Power, who also appears as an extra in most of the comics studio scenes.

The series' theme music was originally a full orchestral piece featuring a heavy horns and woodwinds sound, an arrangement very much in style of the Superman and Batman movies. The opening sequence that accompanied it featured Bob McKay at his artist's desk drawing, inking, then coloring a Mad-Dog comic as the credits appeared. (In reality, inked comic art is not colored directly; the colors are added to the engraving plates before printing) The show's title appeared in a thin, 3-D rendition of Helvetica font in the pilot episode; after, it was redesigned to be a bolder capital font, but with the same yellow base and red shadowing color. The opening credits appeared in a bold comic-style font. In the second season, as part of the show's revamping, a short opening credits sequence, just featuring the title, was used. The theme music also changed to a soft classical tune, featuring a flute.

In addition to the change in Bob's career setting in the second season, the set of Bob and Kaye's house significantly changed as well. There were no references in the scripts to suggest that the McKays had moved, however.

Shortly after the cancellation of Bob, Lisa Kudrow was cast in her iconic role of Phoebe Buffay on the sitcom Friends. Cynthia Stevenson would later be cast by Bob producers Bob and Cheri Steinkellner as one of the leads for their sitcom Hope & Gloria.

Critical and viewer response
Bob was one of four sitcoms CBS assembled on Friday nights in an effort to challenge the dominance of TGIF, the family sitcom block that aired on ABC, in fall 1992. Joining Bob as one of the two new efforts was The Golden Palace, a continuation/spin-off of the NBC hit The Golden Girls that CBS outbid NBC for the rights to air it. The lineup was supplemented by two of CBS’ top ten sitcom hits, the long running Designing Women and the moderate hit Major Dad. Although Bob was heavily promoted by TV Guide, which featured it on the cover twice during its freshman season, the entire Friday night lineup underperformed as a whole; none of the sitcoms finished the season in the top 60 in the ratings.

When the season ended, the other three Friday night sitcoms were cancelled and Bob underwent a retooling, saved from the axe by a relocation to Mondays and a subsequent ratings boost. However, the show was moved back to Fridays for the new season and again saw ratings trouble. The series was canceled after a one-off Monday broadcast on December 27. Three remaining episodes finally aired during TV Land reruns in the late 1990s.

As part of the promotion of this series, Marvel Comics published a six-issue "Mad Dog" limited series.  The title was presented "flip-book" style, with a Silver Age style story by Ty Templeton on one side and a Modern Age style tale on the other side with work by Evan Dorkin and Gordon Purcell. Dorkin has referred to the series as one of the worst things he's ever written, while Templeton holds his time on the series as one of his favorite professional experiences.

Home media
On April 3, 2012, CBS DVD (distributed by Paramount) released Bob: The Complete Series on DVD in Region 1.

References

External links

Episode guide

1990s American sitcoms
1990s American workplace comedy television series
1992 American television series debuts
1993 American television series endings
CBS original programming
Television series by CBS Studios
English-language television shows
Television shows about comics
Fictional cartoonists
Television shows set in Chicago